Jon Zabala (born 27 November 1996) is a Spanish rugby union player, who plays for AS Béziers Hérault.

He is an international player with Spain national rugby team.

References

External link

Spanish rugby union players
Spain international rugby union players
Spanish expatriate rugby union players
Spanish expatriate sportspeople in France
1996 births
Sportspeople from Getxo
Living people
Aviron Bayonnais players
Tarbes Pyrénées Rugby players
AS Béziers Hérault players
Rugby union props
Rugby union players from the Basque Country (autonomous community)
Expatriate rugby union players in France
Sportspeople from Biscay